The Prophet MKI, also known as the Prophet Mk.1, or simply the Prophet 1, was a sports prototype race car, based on the Lola T330 Formula 5000 car, and used in the SCCA's revived Can-Am series, between 1978 and 1979.

References

Can-Am cars
Sports prototypes